Sajas is a commune in the Haute-Garonne department in southwestern France.

Population

Personalities
Sajas is infamous for producing the impostor Arnaud du Tilh who played a major role in the 16th century story of Martin Guerre.

See also
Communes of the Haute-Garonne department

References

Communes of Haute-Garonne